Maurangerfjord or Maurangsfjorden is a fjord in Kvinnherad Municipality in Vestland county, Norway. The inner end of the Maurangsfjorden branches into the Nordrepollen and Austrepollen. There are several villages located along the fjord:  Ænes, Sundal, Austrepollen, Nordrepollen, and Gjetingsdalen. The Mauranger Hydroelectric Power Station is located in the village of Austrepollen.

See also
 List of Norwegian fjords

References

Fjords of Vestland
Kvinnherad